POX FC is a Cypriot football club based in the village of Xylotymbou. The club was formed in 2006 after a merger of two Xylotymbou clubs, Kimonas Xylotympou and Omonia Xylotymbou. The club won their first professional title in 2017, by winning the Cypriot Third Division.

Players

First team squad

For recent transfers, see List of Cypriot football transfers summer 2021

League history

Honours
 Cypriot Third Division
 Winners (1): 2016–17

 Cypriot Cup for lower divisions:
 Winners (1): 2016–17 (shared)

References

Football clubs in Cyprus
Association football clubs established in 2006
2006 establishments in Cyprus
Football clubs in Larnaca